Elena Krutova (born 19 May 1980) is a Russian Paralympic archer.  She competed at the 2020 Summer Paralympics, in Mixed team, winning a bronze medal.

She competed at the 2015 World Archery Para Championships, 2017 World Archery Para Championships, and 2019 World Archery Para Championships, winning a gold medal.

References 

Paralympic archers of Russia
Archers at the 2020 Summer Paralympics
Paralympic bronze medalists for the Russian Paralympic Committee athletes
Living people
Medalists at the 2020 Summer Paralympics
Paralympic medalists in archery
1980 births
21st-century Russian people